Hong Kwang-ho is a South Korean actor mainly known for his works in musical theater. Hong is best known worldwide for his portrayal of Thuy in the 2014 West End revival of the musical Miss Saigon.

Life and career
Hong was born in Seoul on April 6, 1982. He was first introduced to musical theatre through his sister who was planning to be an actor, and with this in mind he entered Kaywon School of Art and Design after her. Later he graduated from Chung-Ang University with Bachelor of Fine Arts in Acting. He made a debut on stage as an ensemble member of the musical The Last Empress. After travelling to London for the West End run of the show he was motivated to be a leading actor, but was unable to land a role for years after returning from the military service.

In 2006 Hong appeared on the Korean production of Miss Saigon as an understudy for Chris. With this experience he landed a role a year later as Haesoo, main character of the musical Cheotsarang (First Love), starring alongside Jo Jung-suk. In the same year he also starred in a Korean production of Sweeney Todd: The Demon Barber of Fleet Street as Tobias.

Hong became the center of attention in 2009 for his portrayal of the title characters in the musical Jekyll & Hyde, one of the best-selling shows in Korean theatre. He was especially noted for being the youngest actor to portray the main character. After his run on Jekyll & Hyde, he starred in a new musical Bballae (The wash) as Solongo, the Mongolian immigrant worker.

The same year Hong appeared in The Phantom of the Opera as Viscount Raoul de Chagny. A year after he was chosen to portray the title character of the show, making him one of the youngest actors in the world to portray The Phantom. In 2012, Hong portrayed Yuri Zhivago in the Korean production of the show Doctor Zhivago after reprising his role as Doctor Jekyll. After Zhivago he played the main character (Miguel de Cervantes/Don Quixote) on The Man of La Mancha, and the male lead Bae Bijang on the show Saljjaki Opseoye (Sweet, Come to Me Stealthily). A year after he also starred in Notre-Dame de Paris as Quasimodo.

In 2014, it was revealed that Cameron Mackintosh had chosen Hong to portray Thuy in the new West End revival of Miss Saigon.  During his year-long run as Thuy, he was critically acclaimed and lauded by audiences and critics alike, and was awarded WhatsOnStage award for Best Supporting Actor in a Musical. After Miss Saigon and his return to Korea, Hong starred as Light Yagami in the 2015 musical adaptation of Death Note along with Kim Junsu as L.

In 2016, he took part in the musical "Bballae" again. And after "Bballae", he starred as Quasimodo in Notre-Dame de Paris

In 2017, he took part in the musical "Mr. Mouse" as Inhoo. Afterwards he took part in the Musical Cyrano de Bergerac The Musical as Cyrano de Bergerac, and he was awarded with the Best Actor award at the Korea Musical Awards. Afterwards he took part in the Musical "Hamlet: Alive" as Hamlet.

In 2022, he reprised his role from 2015 as Light Yagami in "Death Note: The Musical". It ran from April 1 to June 26 at the Chungmu Art Center.

Theatre credits
2002 "The Last Empress" - ensemble
2006 "Miss Saigon" - ensemble, 1st cover of Chris&Thuy
2007 "First Love" - Haesoo
2007 "Sweeney Todd: The Demon Barber of Fleet Street" - Tobias
2008 "See what I wanna see" - robber, newsman
2009 "Jekyll & Hyde" - Jekyll, HydeI
2009 "The wash" - Solongo
2009 "The Phantom of the Opera" - Raoul, Vicomte de Chagny 
2010 "The Phantom of the Opera" - Phantom
2011 "Jekyll & Hyde" - Dr. Henry Jekyll, Mr. Edward Hyde
2012 "Doctor Zhivago" - Yuri Zhivago
2012 "The Man of La Mancha" - Miguel de Cervantes/Don Quixote
2013 "Sweet, Come to Me Stealthily" - Bae Bijang
2013 "Notre-Dame de Paris" - Quasimodo
2014 "Miss Saigon" 25th Anniversary West End 2014 revival  - Thuy
2015 "Death Note" - Light Yagami
2016 "The wash" - Solongo
2016 "Notre-Dame de Paris" - Quasimodo
2017 "Mr. Mouse"- Inhoo
2017 "Cyrano de Bergerac The Musical"- Cyrano de Bergerac
2017 "Hamlet: Alive- Hamlet
2018 "The Man of La Mancha" - Miguel de Cervantes / Don Quixote
2019 "Jekyll & Hyde" - Dr. Henry Jekyll / Mr. Edward Hyde
2019-2020 "Sweeney Todd: The Demon Barber of Fleet Street" - Sweeney Todd 
2021 "The Man of La Mancha" - Miguel de Cervantes / Don Quixote
2021 "Natasha, Pierre & The Great Comet of 1812" " - Pierre Bezukhov 
2021-2022  Jekyll & Hyde - Jekyll/Hyde
2022 "Death Note" - Light Yagami
2023 "Death Note" - Light Yagami

Filmography

2008 "Gogo70" - Junyeop
2016 "Miss Saigon : 25th Anniversary Performance" - Thuy

References

1982 births
Living people
21st-century South Korean male actors
South Korean male musical theatre actors
Male actors from Seoul